Simultaneous interpretation (SI) is when an interpreter translates the message from the source language to the target language in real-time. Unlike in consecutive interpreting, this way the natural flow of the speaker is not disturbed and allows for a fairly smooth output for the listeners.

History 

The Nuremberg trials (1945–1946) are considered to be the official birthdate of simultaneous interpretation, however, simultaneous interpretation was invented as early as in 1926. A patent was received by an IBM employee Alan Gordon Finlay and was used sporadically before the Second World War. Finlay played an essential role in the design and development of SI equipment together with Edward Filene, the American businessman and philanthropist.

In 1925, E. Filene wrote a letter to Sir. E. Drummond in which the concept simultaneous interpretation is used for the first time in written history. In this letter, E. Filene talked about his idea to use simultaneous interpretation in the League of Nations as early as April 2, 1925. Filene wrote to Sir. E. Drummond on that day:One high-quality microphone will be placed on a pedestal or stand at the speaker's location to pick up his words. This microphone will be connected through an amplifier to a number of headsets which will be installed in an adjoining quiet room. Each headset will terminate at an interpreter's booth or position in the room. The interpreter's booth will be provided with an ordinary telephone desk stand on which is mounted a high-quality close-talking microphone which will be connected through another amplifier to a number of headsets located at a designated section of the auditorium or meeting hall. The translated speech of each interpreter would follow simultaneously with the delivery of the original speech, the only delay being that of recording the speech and the ability of the interpreter to translate directly and rapidly from the stenographic notes received from the recorder.

The Nuremberg Trials employed four official languages: English, French, German and Russian. It was feared that consecutive interpretation would slow down the proceedings significantly. This led to the introduction of an entirely new technique, extempore simultaneous interpretation. This technique of interpretation requires the interpreter to listen to a speaker in a source (or passive) language and orally translate that speech into another language in real-time, that is, simultaneously, through headsets and microphones. Interpreters were split into four sections, one for each official language, with three interpreters per section working from the other three languages into the fourth (their mother tongue). For instance, the English booth consisted of three interpreters, one working from German into English, one working from French, and one from Russian, etc. Defendants who did not speak any of the four official languages were provided with consecutive court interpreters. Some of the languages heard over the course of the proceedings included Yiddish, Hungarian, Czech, Ukrainian, and Polish.

Interpreters were recruited and examined by the respective countries in which the official languages were spoken: the United States, United Kingdom, France, the Soviet Union, Germany, Switzerland, and Austria, as well as in special cases Belgium and the Netherlands. Many were former translators, army personnel, and linguists, some were experienced consecutive interpreters, others were ordinary individuals and even recent secondary school-graduates who led international lives in multilingual environments. It was believed, that the qualities that made the best interpreters were a broad sense of culture, encyclopedic knowledge, inquisitiveness, as well as a naturally calm disposition.
 
Yet, despite the extensive trial and error, without the interpretation system the trials would not have been possible and in turn, revolutionized the way multilingual issues were addressed in tribunals and conferences. A number of the interpreters following the trials were recruited into the newly formed United Nations.

Pros and cons 

Because there are no long pauses for the interpreter to stop and think through the speech during simultaneous interpretation, this type of interpretation allows for a smooth experience for the listeners as they don't need to wait to understand the message. Therefore, simultaneous interpretation is best-suited for large-scale events and conferences where the delay in the delivery of the speech could ruin the experience of the event.

On the downside, simultaneous interpretation can be stressful for the interpreters because they have to do their best in a very limited time and they usually don't know the text until they hear it (just the topic). Also, simultaneous interpreters have to do their best to keep the tone and the choice of words of the speaker, which adds even more stress.

Modes 

 Simultaneous interpretation with electronic/electric equipment – Using this method, the information is transferred into the target language the moment interpreters understand a "unit" of meaning. The speakers and the interpreters talk into microphones, and the interpreters and the listeners use earphones.
 Whispered interpreting or chuchotage – This is simultaneous interpreting without equipment. It works just like simultaneous interpretation with equipment but in this case, no microphones or headphones are used. Simultaneous interpreters sit next to the people who do not understand the source language and whisper the interpretation in their ears.

Equipment 

Traditional conference interpreting equipment (hardware) helps to make sure that all listeners can understand interpretation well.
The process of simultaneous interpretation with traditional hardware commonly utilizes the following steps:
 The speaker talks into a microphone.
 His or her speech is broadcast to the interpreter who sits in a sound-proof interpreter booth and listens through headphones.
 As the interpreter listens to the speech, he or she translates it in real-time into a microphone.
 The interpretation is transmitted wirelessly to the headphones of the event attendees.

Analogue interpretation systems

Infrared systems 

This technology uses invisible pulses of infrared light to transmit the interpretation feed. Attendees receive the stream to their headphones via multi-channel receivers. This system is sensitive to obstruction, so it must be placed in front of the listeners with clear line-of-sight and away from bright or flashing lights that can interfere with infrared systems. The range of infrared systems is also often lacking, with several infrared emitters often being be used to achieve required transmission ranges.

Medium range FM interpretation systems (handheld) 

These systems use radio waves to transmit the speech (either original or translated) to the attendees. Just like infrared systems, FM systems are also connected to multi-channel receivers with headphones. These systems are portable and are not sensitive to obstructions or light, and work well outside. FM transmission systems  come with a more limited range of around 250 feet.

Longer range FM systems (portable) 

If the venue of the event exceeds 1000 feet, longer range FM systems are needed. Longer range FM systems are more powerful, leading to improved cancellation of radio interference, increasing sound quality. A purpose built high-power systems is often more cost-effective than adapting a medium-power system for large audiences and increased range requirements.

Interpreter booths 

Interpreter booths are a must for simultaneous interpretation where traditional equipment is used. Interpreters have to be in the venue and it tends to get quite noisy. Having in mind the stress the interpreters have to endure during big conferences, it is very important to ensure they have a sound-proof working environment – that is, interpreter booths.

Interpreter booths can be either permanent or mobile. Both variants are strictly regulated by the International Organization for Standardization (ISO) standards relating to conference interpreting.

As for the shape, interpreter booths come as tabletop booths and as full-size interpreting booths. As the name suggests, the first ones are placed on the top of the table and are great because they're easy to transport and set up. On the other hand, they're open in the back, which means you can't completely ensure comfortable work conditions for the interpreters because these booths are not fully sound-proof.

Full-size interpreter booths are like little houses. They have walls, floors, ceilings, doors, and their own ventilation systems. Usually, they can fit at least two interpreters and larger booths can fit even four. Naturally, such interpreter booths are much harder to transport and assemble and require at least a couple of technicians for this task.
 Interpreters need to have a clear view of speakers, the podium and presentations.
 Interpreters also need great access to the Internet.
 They also need to have a sufficient number of power outlets for their laptops, tablets, and any other gadgets they may need to work.
 High air quality is a non-negotiable for obvious reasons, too. That's where sensors that measure  step in.
 Optimal acoustic conditions, meaning fans should be as quiet as possible and sound insulation from other booths should be close to perfection.

Interpretation apps 

An alternative to traditional interpretation systems is mobile apps. IT specialists in the simultaneous interpretation field developed systems that can work alone or in combination with traditional interpretation hardware.

Simultaneous interpretation apps are mobile systems that stream real-time audio on listeners' phones through local wifi or listeners' mobile data. The speaker's stream is transmitted to interpreters who then, with a special broadcaster or traditional consoles, stream their interpretations. Interpreters can work either onsite or remotely, in which case interpretation booths are no longer needed. Likewise, people can listen to the stream from anywhere.

References 

Translation
Language interpretation